The Ulya is a river in northern Khabarovsk Krai in Russia. It freezes up in late October through early November and remains icebound until May. The first Russian to reach the Pacific Ocean was Ivan Moskvitin who sailed down the Ulya and wintered near its mouth in 1639. Vasili Poyarkov reused his huts in 1646. The Ulya was one of the water routes to and from Okhotsk. From its tributaries either the Lama Portage or the Alachak Portage led to the Mati River which flows north to the Maya, which leads to the Aldan and then the Lena to Yakutsk.

References

James R Gibson, "Feeding the Russian Fur Trade", 1969

Rivers of Khabarovsk Krai
Drainage basins of the Sea of Okhotsk